The Midwest Theater, at 1707 Broadway in Scottsbluff, Nebraska, was built in 1946.  It was designed in Moderne style by Charles D. Strong and built by the Art Moore Contracting Co..  It was listed on the National Register of Historic Places in 1997.

References

External links 
More photos of the Midwest Theater at Wikimedia Commons

Commercial buildings on the National Register of Historic Places in Nebraska
Streamline Moderne architecture in the United States
Commercial buildings completed in 1946
Buildings and structures in Scotts Bluff County, Nebraska
National Register of Historic Places in Scotts Bluff County, Nebraska